Ingar Andreas Nordlund Andreassen (17 April 1922 – 18 December 1998) was a Norwegian speed skater, born in Jevnaker.  He competed in 10,000 m at the 1952 Winter Olympics in Oslo.

References

External links 
 

1922 births
1998 deaths
People from Jevnaker
Norwegian male speed skaters
Olympic speed skaters of Norway
Speed skaters at the 1952 Winter Olympics
Sportspeople from Innlandet